John Read (fl. 1683-1688) was an English buccaneer, privateer, and pirate active from South America to the East Indies to the Indian Ocean.

History
Along with navigator and chronicler William Dampier, Read was a crewman aboard John Cook's 1683 privateering expedition which captured a prize ship they renamed Bachelor's Delight. Cook took them around Cape Horn to raid Spain's Pacific territories, joining a flotilla of other buccaneers including Charles Swan's Cygnet. Cook died in 1684, replaced by Edward Davis; Read, Dampier, and others soon transferred to Cygnet. After some unproductive raids Swan headed west across the Pacific in early 1686, his lack of success causing the crew to grow unruly. After a stop at Guam they arrived at Mindanao in the Philippines in June 1686. The crew soon mutinied, ejecting Swan and electing Josiah Teat as Captain, who was himself soon replaced as Captain by Read, setting sail in early 1687.

Read sailed Cygnet through the East Indies with little treasure to show for the voyage. In early 1688 they landed on Australia. Dampier, tired of sailing with Read and his crew, asked to be put ashore in the Nicobar Islands in 1688. Read sailed to the Indian Ocean, capturing their first lucrative prize ship in the process. On India's southwestern Coromandel coast the crew broke up, with many of the crew leaving to serve on Mughal ships. Read then took Cygnet to Madagascar where more of his sailors joined other pirate crews; Read himself took his earnings and boarded a ship bound for New York to retire from pirate life. The remaining sailors under Teat sailed back to Coromandel “where Captain Teat and his own men went ashore to serve the Mogul,” though Cygnet itself was in poor condition and finally sank at Madagascar.

See also
Basil Ringrose - A chronicler like Dampier, he also sailed aboard Cygnet but was killed in a 1683 raid.

Notes

References

17th-century pirates
Year of birth missing
Year of death missing
English pirates
Piracy in the Indian Ocean